Maradana is a genus of snout moths. It was described by Frederic Moore in 1884.

Species
 Maradana adelinae Leraut, 2009
 Maradana africalis Leraut, 2007
 Maradana alcardi Leraut, 2007
 Maradana bernardii Leraut, 2007
 Maradana boudinoti Leraut, 2007
 Maradana centrafricalis Leraut, 2007
 Maradana dargei Leraut, 2007
 Maradana desertalis Hampson, 1908
 Maradana fuscolimbalis (Ragonot, 1887)
 Maradana harpyialis (Walker, 1859)
 Maradana himoensis Leraut, 2007
 Maradana joannisalis Leraut, 2011
 Maradana lamottealis Leraut, 2011
 Maradana maesi Leraut, 2007
 Maradana metayei Leraut, 2007
 Maradana minimalis (Amsel, 1949)
 Maradana nimbaensis Leraut, 2007
 Maradana oubanguialis Leraut, 2011
 Maradana pallidalis Leraut, 2011
 Maradana pictalis Leraut, 2011
 Maradana recisalis (Swinhoe, 1885)
 Maradana rivulata Moore, 1884
 Maradana rubicundalis (Swinhoe, 1886)
 Maradana vidualis (Chrétien, 1911)
 Maradana vinacealis Leraut, 2007

References

Pyralini
Pyralidae genera